Jerzy Dominik (born 5 December 1964) is a Polish speed skater. He competed in three events at the 1988 Winter Olympics.

References

External links
 

1964 births
Living people
Polish male speed skaters
Olympic speed skaters of Poland
Speed skaters at the 1988 Winter Olympics
Sportspeople from Zakopane